Ćojluk is a village in the municipality of Srebrenik, Bosnia and Herzegovina.

Demographics 
According to the 2013 census, its population was 130, all Bosniaks.

References

Populated places in Srebrenik